Ruslan Mykolayovych Yermolenko is a Ukrainian retired footballer.

Career
Andrey Belousov is a pupil of the Kiev sports with Dynamo-3 Kyiv and Dynamo-2 Kyiv from 1998 until 2003. In 2002 he played also for Obolon Kyiv, Obolon-2 Bucha and Nyva Vinnytsia. In 2003 he played for Metalist Kharkiv and Metalist-2 Kharkiv. In 2004 he returned to Nyva Vinnytsia where he played 30 matches and scored 3 goal. In 2005 he played for Stal Alchevsk, Borysfen Boryspil and in 2006 he moved to Desna Chernihiv the main club of the city of Chernihiv where he played 2 seasons, playing 30 matches and scored 2 goals. In 2007 he moved to Dnister Ovidiopol playing 32 matches and 11 matches with Feniks-Illichovets Kalinine. In 2009 he returned to Desna Chernihiv, where he played 16 matches and scored 4 goals. In 2010 he played 10 matches with Krymteplytsia Molodizhne and scoring 1 goal. In 2014 he moved to Arsenal Kyiv.

Honours
Dynamo Kyiv
 Ukrainian Cup: (1) 2002 

Metalist Kharkiv
 Ukrainian First League: (1) 2003–04

Dynamo-2 Kyiv
 Ukrainian First League: (3) 1998–99, 1999–2000, 2000–01

References

External links 
 Ruslan Ermolenkov footballfacts.ru
 Ruslan Ermolenkov allplayers.in.ua

1983 births
Living people
Footballers from Chernihiv
Association football midfielders
FC Desna Chernihiv players
FC Dynamo-3 Kyiv players
FC Dynamo-2 Kyiv players
FC Obolon-Brovar Kyiv players
FC Nyva Vinnytsia players
FC Metalist Kharkiv players
FC Metalist-2 Kharkiv players
FC Stal Alchevsk players
FC Borysfen Boryspil players
FC Dnister Ovidiopol players
FC Feniks-Illichovets Kalinine players
FC Arsenal Kyiv players
Ukrainian footballers
Ukrainian Premier League players
Ukrainian First League players
Ukrainian Second League players